Zhang Dinghuang (1895–1986), also known as Zhang Fengju was a Chinese-American antiquarian, Linguistics, literary critic, poet, and translator. He was born in Nanchang and an expert in antique manuscripts. Zhang was a supporting but key figure of the rich 20th century Chinese literary movements.

He was a talented multi-linguist who studied in Japan and France, a professor at Beijing University and Sino Franco University, and also was active in the literary scene. After World War II he also was a primary figure to recover a collection of looted antique manuscripts for Taiwan's National Central Library (the literary equivalent of antiques of the Palace Museum).

Early years  
When 15 years old, he enrolled in the Nanchang Army Survey Academy, following elder brother Zhang Dingfan, an officer in the "Dare to Die" regiment of the Xinhai Revolution. He then attended Kyoto Imperial University. Returning from Japan in 1921, he began his literary and teaching career of the 1920s and 1930s, and activity to develop vernacular Chinese literature.

He taught at Peking Women's College of Education, Peking University, L'Institute des Hautes Études Chinoises of the Sorbonne in the 1930s, and the Sino-French University in Shanghai. He mastered Japanese, French, and English, which would serve him well decades later. In 1937 he married Zhang Huijun .

Zhang authored and translated works in French, Japanese and English. Examples include "Shelley" and "Baudelaire". He worked closely with key figures who shaped modern Chinese literature and education today. These included Guo Moruo, Cheng Fangwu, Zhang Ziping, Zheng Boqi ,  Xu Zuzheng , Shen Yinmo, Lu Xun, and Yu Dafu. All of them participated in the journals Creation Quarterly, Yusi, Contemporary Review, and New Youth. These provided forums for lively and heated discourse on the transition to the vernacular Chinese language; weeklies for short insights or responses, quarterlies for considered and developed ideas. The goal was to bring the written language closer to everyday speech and use subject matter from everyday life.

Later years after 1940
In the 1940s, he worked primarily for the Chinese Ministry of Education and National Central Library in the areas of antiquities, education and publications. A lasting achievement was to recover the works of the Rare Book Preservation Society  which were looted during World War II. It began with the Yuyuan Road Conferences  in 1945–1946 to identify the wartime booty that Japan took. Key members included Jiang Fucong, Ma Xulun, Zheng Zhenduo, and Zhang Fengju. Official Yuyuan Road  Ministry conference minutes shows  is the lower signature of the first line.

March 23, 1946, the Ministry appointed Zhang Fengju to the Chinese Occupation Mission in Japan as head of the Fourth Section (Education and Culture). He left for Tokyo on April 1 and began discussions with the U.S. Command General Headquarters (GHQ) the next day. Because of his gift in languages and his participation in the original preservation effort, he held substantive meetings with all parties without translators. In two months, over 135,000 volumes were retrieved. By the year's end, they were returned to the National Central Library where they form the core of the rare books collection today. Many other university and museum collections were also retrieved.

After 1949 and with the excesses which followed the Chinese Civil War, his closest friends and associates from the early years were on the mainland. His closest recent associates were in Taiwan. He favored neither side and preferred non-violence. He did not participate in any government activities after 1960 but kept in touch with a network of old friends in Taiwan and the U.S. including Li Shu-hua , Zhu Jiahua , Gu Mengyu , Y. H. Ku,  Zhu Shiming , and Shang Zhen. He moved to the U.S. with his wife in 1965 to join his children. He died on February 2, 1986, in Atlanta, Georgia.

His handwritten diaries and reports, now at National Central Library in Taipei, contain details of the recovery looted manuscripts and books from Tokyo.

References 

1895 births
1986 deaths
1910s in China
1920s in China
1930s in China
1930s in France
1940s in China
1945 in Japan
Art and cultural repatriation after World War II
Art crime
Book and manuscript collectors
Chinese antiquarians
Chinese antiques experts
Chinese poets
Chinese–French translators
Chinese-Japanese culture
Classical Chinese philosophy
Cultural history of World War II
Japanese occupation of Hong Kong
Japanese war crimes
Kyoto University alumni
Academic staff of Peking University
People of the Republic of China
Linguists of Chinese
National libraries
Occupied Japan
People from Nanchang
People of the Second Sino-Japanese War
Sorbonne University
20th-century antiquarians
Chinese emigrants to the United States